Jacques Auguste Édouard Souberbielle (17 June 1899 – 29 January 1986) was a 20th-century French organist, Kapellmeister and music educator.

Biography 
Souberbielle first studied with his mother, a former pupil of Émile Delaborde, son of Charles-Valentin Alkan.

He continued his studies at the Schola Cantorum de Paris with Abel Decaux, Maurice Sergent, and Louis Vierne. In 1925, he obtained a first prize in harmony (under Jules Mouquet) and a first prize in organ (under Eugène Gigout) at the Conservatoire de Paris.

During his career, he was choirmaster or organist of several churches in Paris: Église Notre-Dame-de-la-Croix de Ménilmontant, then St-Ambroise (1929–43), and finally St-Pierre-de-Chaillot and Église Saint-Joseph-des-Carmes.

He married Madeleine, daughter of Léon Bloy. They had a son, Léon Souberbielle (1923–1991), organist, choirmaster, author of a book on Le Plein-Jeu de l’Orgue Français à l'époque classique (1660 – 1740), 1977 (reissued by Delatour).

From 1926, he taught the organ at the Schola Cantorum, then at the École César Franck from 1935, and at the l’Institut catholique de Paris (Gregorian Institute) from 1943. He trained a number of leading organists including Arsène Bedois, Francis Chapelet, Michel Chapuis, Lynne Davis, Jacques Dussouil, André Isoir, Thierry Martin, Jean-Albert Villard, Odile Bailleux, etc.

References

Published works 
Jeux d'enfants pour piano, Delatour France (2012). EAN 9790232107240
Divertissement pour quatuor à cordes, Delatour France (2012). EAN 9790232107257

External links 
 Musica et Memoria Note 5 by Denis Havard de la Montagne, at the bottom of the article on Jean Fellot by É. Souberbielle.
 Alexis Galpérine. Édouard Souberbielle, un maître de l’orgue, Delatour France (2010). Note: Alexis Galpérine, violinist, is Édouard Souberbielle's grandson.
 France Orgue A record of varied recordings, included with Galperine's book.
 Édouard Souberbielle, grand pédagogue de l’orgue on Res Musica (6 June 2012)
 Un Maître de l'orgue, Édouard Souberbielle biography with numerous photos
 Édouard Souberbielle, un maître de l'orgue on Delatour France
 Recordings by Édouard Souberbielle on France-Orgue.org
 Édouard Souberbielle - Divertissement pour quatuor à cordes on YouYube

French classical organists
French male organists
Schola Cantorum de Paris alumni
1899 births
People from Tarbes
1986 deaths
20th-century organists
20th-century French male musicians
20th-century classical musicians
Male classical organists